Park Jin-cheol (born 12 June 1982) is a South Korean para table tennis player. He won one of the bronze medals in the men's individual C2 event at the 2020 Summer Paralympics held in Tokyo, Japan. He also won the silver medal in the men's team C1–2 event.

References

Living people
1982 births
South Korean male table tennis players
Paralympic table tennis players of South Korea
Paralympic silver medalists for South Korea
Paralympic bronze medalists for South Korea
Paralympic medalists in table tennis
Table tennis players at the 2020 Summer Paralympics
Medalists at the 2020 Summer Paralympics
Place of birth missing (living people)
21st-century South Korean people